Benjamin Robert Hamond Broadbent (born 1 February 1965) is a British economist and has been Deputy Governor for Monetary Policy at the Bank of England since 1 July 2014. He had previously been an external member of the Bank of England's Monetary Policy Committee between June 2011 and June 2014.

Early life
He attended St Paul's School, London from 1977 to 1982, gained a first-class honours degree in Economics from Trinity Hall, Cambridge in 1988, and then studied for a Ph.D at Harvard University, where he was a Fulbright Scholar.

Career
After working for HM Treasury, he worked for the Bank of England, before becoming an Assistant Professor at Columbia University. He joined Goldman Sachs in 2000 as Senior European Economist, a position he held until 2011. In June 2011, he replaced the departing Andrew Sentance on the Bank of England Monetary Policy Committee.

Broadbent was reappointed, for a second term, Deputy Governor for the Bank of England on 31 May 2019.

References

1965 births
Living people
People educated at St Paul's School, London
Alumni of Trinity Hall, Cambridge
Harvard University alumni
Columbia University staff
British economists
Goldman Sachs people